The 16th Fajr International Film Festival held 1–11 February 1998 in Tehran, Iran.

The Glass Agency (Ebrahim Hatamikia, 1998) was the festival's best film in "Competition of Iranian Cinema" and The Promise (Luc Dardenne and Jean-Pierre Dardenne, 1996) —a Belgian film— was the festival's best film in "Competition of International Cinema".

The Glass Agency won a record-tying nine awards including Best Film, Best Director and Best Screenplay.

Selection committee 
Majid Nadiri, festival's public relations officer, was announced the selection committee members on 3 January as below:
 Parvaneh Massoumi, actress
 Mohammad-Reza Honarmand, director
 , director
 , producer
 , producer

Juries 
Competition of Iranian Cinema
 Ezatollah Entezami, Actor
 Kiumars Pourahmad, director
 , director
 Fereshteh Taerpour, producer
 Majid Majidi, director

Competition of International Cinema
 Abbas Kiarostami, Iranian director
 , Italian producer
 Jean-Michel Frodon, French film critic
 Tadao Sato, Japanese film critic
 Sandip Ray, Indian director

Competition of Iranian Cinema 

Awards and nominations of the Competition of Iranian Cinema sections are below:

Audience Choice

Competition

Non-nomination Crystal Simorgh

Films with multiple nominations and awards

The following 10 films received multiple nominations: 

The following 3 films received multiple awards:

Competition of International Cinema 

Non-nomination Crystal Simorgh

Additional Honorary Diploma
 Best Cinematography: Mahmoud Kalari  – The Pear Tree (Iran)
 Best Costume Design:  and   –  (Iran)

Non-competitive sections 
The festival's other sidebar sections included tributes to Anthony Quinn and Ezzatolah Entezami, retrospectives of the works of three directors —Fred Zinnemann, Krzysztof Kieślowski and Ebrahim Hatamikia— , screening of the selected works for which Ennio Morricone had composed the music, "Festival of Festivals", and special screenings.

Facing Mirrors 
Retrospective of the Fred Zinnemann's career highlights:
 The Men (1950)
 High Noon (1952)
 Behold a Pale Horse (1964)
 A Man for All Seasons (1966)
 The Day of the Jackal (1973)
 Julia (1977)

Retrospective of the Krzysztof Kieślowski's career highlights:
 Personnel (1975 TV film)
 The Calm (1976)
 Camera Buff (1979)
 Short Working Day (1981)
 Dekalog (1988 TV series): 1, 8 and 10 episodes
 A Short Film About Killing (1988)

The Green Narrative 
Retrospective of the Ebrahim Hatamikia's career highlights:
 Identity (1987)
 The Scout (1989)
 The Immigrant (1990)
  (1992)
 From Karkheh to Rhein (1993)
  (1994)
 The Scent of Joseph's Shirt (1996)
 Minoo Watchtower (1996)
 The Glass Agency (1998)

For All Seasons 
Tribute to the Anthony Quinn by screening of 14 films of his career.

Tribute to the Ezzatolah Entezami by his career highlights:
 The Cow (Dariush Mehrjui, 1969)
 Hajji Washington (Ali Hatami, 1982)
 Kamalolmolk (Ali Hatami, 1985)
 The Lodgers (Dariush Mehrjui, 1987)
  (Masoud Jafari Jozani, 1987)
 Grand Cinema (1989)
 Once Upon a Time, Cinema (Mohsen Makhmalbaf, 1992)
  (1992)
  (Behrouz Afkhami, 1994)
  (Rakhshan Bani-Etemad, 1995)

Once Upon a Time 
Tribute the Ennio Morricone by his career highlights:
 A Fistful of Dollars (Sergio Leone, 1964)
 The Hawks and the Sparrows (Pier Paolo Pasolini, 1966)
 My Name Is Nobody (Tonino Valerii, 1973)
 Last Days of Mussolini (Carlo Lizzani, 1974)
 Todo modo (Elio Petri, 1976)
 The Desert of the Tartars (Valerio Zurlini, 1976)
 Casualties of War (Brian De Palma, 1989)
 The Escort (Ricky Tognazzi, 1993)
 The Long Silence (Margarethe von Trotta, 1993)
 A Pure Formality (Giuseppe Tornatore, 1994)

Ceremony information 
63 films were requested to participate in the festival which 22 of them were approved for the "Competition of Iranian Cinema" section. For the first time, FIFF had had opening ceremony that took place on 31 January 1998, at the City Theater in Tehran, Iran.

The "Competition of International Cinema" section in the festival was introduced for the second time. The first time was in 1990. The section was added in order to FIFF accredit by FIAPF as a competitive international film festival. Sheila Whitaker mentioned that this was the first time in the festival's history, held an international competition with an international jury, headed by Abbas Kiarostami. At the closing ceremony, Kiarostami read out a statement in which he made it clear that the jury felt it impossible to give awards to foreign films that could only be screened in Iran with major cuts.

The "Iranian Film Market" (IFM) was established and took place during the festival. For example, National Film Development Corporation of India (NFDC), the central agency of Indian cinema, sent a delegation to the IFM and spent  at this market.

Critical response 
16th FIFF marked by a powerful selection committee that did not allow many commercial films to enter into competition section. An Audience Award also introduced this year. All these made the FIFF regain the credibility it had in the past, i.e. before the politicians not familiar with cinema took charge. However, impact of the former government's policies still remained.

Footnotes

Notes

References

Sources

External links 

 16th Fajr International Film Festival on SourehCinema (in Persian)

1998 film awards
Fajr International Film Festival ceremonies